This is a list of broadcast television stations that are licensed in the U.S. state of Nebraska.

Full-power stations
VC refers to the station's PSIP virtual channel. RF refers to the station's physical RF channel.

Defunct full-power stations
Channel 10: KFOR-TV - CBS - Lincoln (5/31/1953-3/13/1954, merged with KOLN-TV)
Channel 16: KTUW - Ind. - Scottsbluff (2006-2009)
Channel 17: KTVG-TV - Fox - Grand Island (2/19/1993-4/5/2010)
Channel 24: KLKE - satellite of KLKN - Albion (1996-2003)

LPTV stations

Translators

Cable-only stations
LNKTV - Local Government and Community Cable - Lincoln

Nebraska

Television stations